Piero Marrazzo (born 29 July 1958) is an Italian journalist and politician. He served as the President of Lazio, the region of Italy containing Rome, from 2005 to 2009.

Piero Marrazzo is the son of Giuseppe Marrazzo (a field journalist noted for his investigations on the Mafia) and Italian-American Luigia Spina. He was a political activist during his youth, leading towards reformist socialism, and obtained a degree in jurisprudence. He went on to become a prominent TV journalist, working for twenty years for RAI, on programmes such as TG2 and TG3, heading the Tuscany journalistic department of RAI, working with Giovanni Minoli (on programmes such as "Cronaca in Diretta", "Drugstories", and "Format"), and finally becoming the anchorman for eight consecutive years of "Mi Manda Rai Tre", for which he is most remembered. In November 2004 he left his job to run for presidency of Lazio as the candidate of centre-left coalition L'Unione; he won the April 2005 regional elections attracting 50.7% of votes.

He suspended himself from his role on Saturday 24 October 2009, after 4 carabinieri officers allegedly tried to blackmail him with video footage, purporting to reveal him in a bedroom with a transsexual prostitute, where a limited quantity of cocaine was also present. Marrazzo admitted the meeting and said that the move paved the way for his resignation. In 2018 the four carabineri officers were found guilty of conspiracy and blackmailing.

References

External links
 
 Personal profile on the official website of the Regione Lazio (Italian version, English version).

Living people
1958 births
Presidents of Lazio
Italian journalists
Italian male journalists
Writers from Rome
Heads of government who were later imprisoned